Evolution: The Best of Iron Butterfly is the fifth and first greatest hits album released in 1971 by American rock band Iron Butterfly. Songs come from four of their albums: Heavy, In-A-Gadda-Da-Vida, Ball and Metamorphosis.

Track listing

Side one
"Iron Butterfly Theme" (Doug Ingle) – 4:34
"Possession" (Ingle) – 2:41
"Unconscious Power" (Ingle, Danny Weis, Ron Bushy) – 2:29
"Flowers and Beads" (Ingle) - 3:05
"Termination" (Eric Brann, Lee Dorman) - 2:50
"In-A-Gadda-Da-Vida" (45 RPM single edit) (Ingle) – 3:10

Side two
"Soul Experience" (Ingle, Bushy, Brann, Dorman) – 2:50
"Stone Believer" (Ingle, Bushy, Dorman) – 5:20
"Belda-Beast" (Brann) – 5:46
"Easy Rider (Let the Wind Pay the Way)" (Ingle, Bushy, Dorman, Robert Woods Edmonson) – 3:06
"Slower Than Guns" (Ingle, Bushy, Dorman, Edmonson) – 3:37

Charts

Band members
Doug Ingle – lead vocals (except where indicated), organs
Ron Bushy – drums
Jerry Penrod – bass on side 1 tracks 1–3
Darryl DeLoach – tambourine and backing vocals on side 1 tracks 1–3
Danny Weis – guitars on side 1 tracks 1–3
Erik Brann – guitars on side 1 tracks 4–6 and side 2 tracks 1 and 3, lead vocals on "Termination" and "Belda-Beast"
Lee Dorman – bass and backing vocals on side 1 tracks 4–6 and side 2 all tracks
Mike Pinera – guitar on side 2 tracks 2, 4 and 5, additional lead vocal on "Stone Believer"
Larry "Rhino" Reinhardt – guitar on side 2 tracks 2, 4 and 5

References

Iron Butterfly compilation albums
1971 greatest hits albums
Atlantic Records compilation albums
Albums produced by Charles Greene (producer)
Albums produced by Brian Stone
albums produced by Richard Podolor